Sidewinder is an EP by Industrial music group Download released in 1996.

Track listing

 "Sidewinder (Remix)" – 5:52
 "Glassblower (Remix)" – 3:30
 "Base Metal (Remix)" – 4:29
 "Chalice" – 3:06
 "Shemaesin" – 5:42
 "IM5" – 3:25
 "Attalal (Haujobb Remix)" – 4:43
 "Lenge T'Agn" – 1:06

Trivia
 The title of track 7 is misspelled on the packaging of this EP—the song is a remix of the composition originally found on Furnace, where it is spelled "Attalal" (with two "L"s) instead of "Attallal" (with three "L"s). However, it could be conjectured that since a "second" mix of "Attalal" appears on Microscopic, the inclusion of a third "L" in the title intentionally points to this being the third remix released.

References

1996 EPs
Download (band) albums
Albums with cover art by Dave McKean
1996 remix albums
Remix EPs